Bodamalai Betta is a  mountain in the Eastern Ghats of South India.

Geography
It is the tallest of a distinct area of hills covering an area about east-west and  km north–south, all with elevation below, surrounded by valleys on the south, west and north and plains to the east. Bodamalai Betta is in a strong (VI) earthquake zone, with on average one every 50 years, with magnitude of 5–6 on the Richter magnitude scale.

 to the north of the peak is the east–west valley of the Palar River, a minor tributary of the Kaveri River There is a local road along the river.

The nearest town is Chinna Cottai by road in Chamarajanagar district, Karnataka state.

Climate
Bodamalai Betta is in an area with a Humid subtropical climate. Temperatures drop sharply at night. February is on average the month with most sunshine. Rainfall and other precipitation peaks around October. January is the driest month.

References

External links
"Southern Indian Subcontinent: 4 Mountain Summits with Prominence of 1,500 meters or greater" Peaklist.org. Retrieved 2011-11-24

Physiographic provinces
Mountains of Tamil Nadu